The 2021–22 Rutgers Scarlet Knights women's basketball team represented Rutgers University during the 2021–22 NCAA Division I women's basketball season. The Scarlet Knights, led by 27th year head coach C. Vivian Stringer, played their home games at the Jersey Mike's Arena, as a member of the Big Ten Conference.

They finished the season 11–20, 3–14 in Big Ten play to finish in thirteenth place.  As the thirteenth seed in the Big Ten women's tournament when they defeated Penn State in the First Round before losing to Indiana in the Second Round.  They were not invited to the NCAA tournament or the WNIT.

Previous season 

The Scarlet Knights finished the season 14–5, 10–3 in Big Ten play to finish in third place.  They received a double-bye into the Quarterfinals of the Big Ten women's tournament when they lost to Iowa.  They received an at-large bid to the NCAA tournament.  As the six seed in the Mercado Regional they lost to BYU in the First Round to end their season.

Roster

Schedule

|-
!colspan=6 style=| Regular season

|-
!colspan=6 style=| Big Ten Women's Tournament

Rankings

The Coaches Poll did not release a Week 2 poll and the AP Poll did not release a poll after the NCAA Tournament.

References 

Rutgers Scarlet Knights women's basketball seasons
Rutgers
Rutgers
Rutgers